Suleyman Sleyman (born 28 December 1979) is a Swedish former professional footballer who played as a defender.

Club career 
Sleyman joined Hammarby IF from Syrianska FC in 1998. He signed for a continuation with Hammarby IF in September 2007, which expired at the end of the 2008 season. He scored his first goal for Hammarby in August 2008, after almost ten years in the club, in the derby where Hammarby faced AIK, 2–2.

He left Hammarby at contract's end and on 26 February 2009, he returned to Syrianska FC. On March 5, 2014, Sleyman officially announced his retirement.

International career 
Sleyman represented the Sweden U17 and U19 teams between 1995 and 1997, and made his full international debut for the Sweden national team in a friendly 1–0 win against Costa Rica on 13 January 2008 when he played for 71 minutes before being replaced by Peter Larsson.

Personal life 
Sleyman belongs to the Syriac community, and declares as Syriac.

Honours
Hammarby
Allsvenskan: 2001

References

External links

1979 births
Living people
People from Södertälje
Swedish people of Assyrian/Syriac descent
Assyrian footballers
Swedish footballers
Sweden international footballers
Hammarby Fotboll players
Syrianska FC players
Allsvenskan players
Stockholm School of Economics alumni
Association football defenders
Sportspeople from Stockholm County